Grace Community School is an inter-denominational Christian school in Delaware, Ohio and offers Kindergarten-twelfth grades.

Mission

The school's mission is "to assist Christian families in their biblical responsibility to train their children to become Christ-like and to fulfill God's purpose for these children in their home, their church, and society."

History

Established in 2006, Grace Community School is directed by a parent-based school board.  Parental involvement is strongly encouraged through PTF meetings and regular school "family" functions.

External links

Private elementary schools in Ohio
Education in Delaware County, Ohio